American is the eleventh studio album by American singer and drag queen RuPaul. The album was released on March 24, 2017, to coincide with the premiere of the ninth season of RuPaul's Drag Race. RuPaul has said that the album is influenced by the 2016 United States presidential election.

Track listing

Chart performance

References

2017 albums
Political music albums by American artists
Dance music albums by American artists
RuPaul albums